Martin Jud was an Italian luger who competed in the early 1980s. A natural track luger, he won two silver medals in the men's doubles event at the FIL World Luge Natural Track Championships (1980, 1984).

Jud won a silver medal in the men's single event at the 1983 FIL European Luge Natural Track Championships in St. Konrad, Austria.

References
Natural track European Championships results 1970-2006.
Natural track World Championships results: 1979-2007

Italian lugers
Italian male lugers
Living people
Year of birth missing (living people)
Sportspeople from Südtirol